Natürlich die Nelli is an East German film directed by Konrad Petzold. It was released in 1959.

Cast
 Evamaria Bath as Mutter Frenz
 Wolfgang Lippert as Vater Frenz
 Senta Bonacker as Oma Trabekow
 Ilse Bastubbe as Frau Steinfuß - Hortnerin
 Dieter Perlwitz as Pionierleiter
 Ada Mahr as Frau Haller
 Karl-Heinz Weiss as Wachtmann (as Karl-Heinz Weiß)
 Barbara Mehlan as Fräulein Reiche
 Birgit Neubert as Nelli
 Marion Weitlich as Ingelore
 Ursula Schulze as Hilde
 Joachim Pape as Kulli
 Joachim Gaier as Volker
 Klaus-Dieter Klebsch as Uwe
 Bernd Hinze as Häuschen
 Gerd Zewner as Lutz
 Reinhold Wieseke as Franz
 André Adolf as Hermann

External links
 

1959 films
East German films
1950s German-language films
1950s German films